Mateja Robnik (born April 6, 1987 in Celje, SR Slovenia, SFR Yugoslavia) is a Slovenian alpine skier. 

Robnik represented Slovenia at two skiing world championships, both times in the Giant Slalom. Her World Cup debut was in 2004, but her best result so far is 11th place in Giant Slalom (Aspen, 2008).

Results in the Slovenian national championship

Results in the European cup

References

External links 
http://www.rtvslo.si/sport/zimski-sporti/sp-v-alpskem-smucanju-2013/kdo-je-kriv-za-zgodnjo-upokojitev-mateje-robnik/302384
http://www.siol.net/sportal/zimski_sporti/alpsko_smucanje/2012/09/mateja_robnik_izigrana_in_na_pragu_upokojitve.aspx

Slovenian female alpine skiers
Sportspeople from Celje
Living people
1987 births